This is a list of venues used for professional baseball in Denver, Colorado. The information is a synthesis of the information contained in the references listed.

Broadway Grounds (I)

Home of
First recorded baseball game in Denver (about April 30, 1862) - McNeils 20, Hulls 7
Denver Brown Stockings (ca. 1878-1879)

Location
East 16th Avenue (north); Lincoln Street (east); East Colfax Avenue aka East 15th Avenue (south); North Broadway (west); catty-corner to the northwest of the state capitol

Currently
Part of the Civic Center

Larimer Street Baseball Park

Home of
 Denver – Colorado League or Rocky Mountain League (1885)* Denver Mountain Lions – Western League (1886)

Location
Larimer Street (southeast); 32nd Street (southwest); Blake Street (northwest); 33rd Street (northeast). About 10 blocks northeast of the eventual site of Coors Field

Currently
Commercial/industrial

River Front Park

Home of
Denver Mountaineers – Western League / Western Association (1887–88)

Location
Plot of land roughly bounded by 16th Street (southwest); 17th Street (northeast); Bassett Street (southeast); and the Platte River (northwest). Part of what is now Commons Park

External links
Sanborn map of part of the park, 1890

Athletic Park or Broadway Park (II)

Home of
 Denver Grizzlies/Mountaineers – Western Association (1889–91 or 92)
 Denver Solis – Colorado State League (1889 only)
 Denver Grizzlies – Western Association (1895 part season)
 Denver Gulfs – Colorado State League (1898 only)
 Denver Grizzlies/Bears – Western League (1900–17)

Location
North Broadway (east, first base); Cherry Creek (northeast, right field corner); West 7th Avenue (north, right field); South 14th Street (now Acoma Street) (west, left field); West 6th Avenue (south, third base) - Denver Health Medical Center across Acoma to the west

Currently
Hotel and parking garage

External links
Sanborn Map showing ballpark, 1890
Sanborn Map showing ballpark, 1903 (rebuilt after fire of July 16, 1901

Merchants Park

Home of
 Denver Bears – Western League (1922–32)
 Denver Bears – Western League (1941 only)
 Denver – Western League (1947 – mid-1948)

Location
600 South Broadway (east, first base); Virginia Avenue (south, third base); Bannock Street (west, left field); Dakota Avenue (north, right field). Near Alameda Avenue (two blocks farther north); location also given as Exposition Avenue (two blocks south) and Broadway

Current use
Site of Broadway Plaza shopping center and business complex

Mile High Stadium

Originally Bears Stadium

Home of
 Denver Bears – Western League (mid-1948–1954)
 Denver Bears/Zephyrs – American Association (1955–62) / Pacific Coast League (1963–68) / AA (1969–92)
 Colorado Rockies – National League (1993–mid-1994 [season shortened by players' strike])

Location
2755 West 17th Avenue (south, right field); Elliot Street (west, first base); West 20th Street (north, third base); Clay Street (east, left field – now part of Mile High Stadium Circle)

Previously
City dump

Currently
Parking lot for Sports Authority Field, which overlaps the old site in the southwest (center field) portion

Coors Field

Home of
Colorado Rockies – NL (1995–present)

Location
2001 Blake Street (southeast, first base); 20th Street (southwest, third base); railroad tracks, then Wewatta Street (northwest, left field); 22nd Street (northeast, right field)

Previously
Denver Pacific Railroad Station and Union Pacific Railroad buildings

See also
Lists of baseball parks

Sources
Ballparks of North America, Michael Benson, McFarland, 1989.

External links
Year-by-year Denver baseball
Ballpark info
Ballparks history

Baseball venues in Colorado
Denver
Sports venues in Denver
Baseball